Temecula FC is an American soccer club based in Temecula, California. Founded in 2013, the team has played in the National Premier Soccer League, the fourth tier of the American soccer pyramid, since 2014. The team colors are red and white.

History
Temecula FC was founded by Brandon Jantz and Vince Paccione on September 9, 2013. The team was accepted into the NPSL on September 26, 2013. They will play in the Southern Conference.

Honors
Riverside County Cup Champions: 2017, 2018, 2021
Riverside Derby Champions: 2019

References

External links

National Premier Soccer League teams
Soccer clubs in Greater Los Angeles
2013 establishments in California
Association football clubs established in 2013
Temecula, California